Brass monkey may refer to:
 Brass Monkey (band), an English folk band formed in 1982
 Brass Monkey (cocktail), an alcoholic drink
 Brass monkey (colloquialism), as used by many English speakers to indicate extremes, especially of cold temperature
 "Brass Monkey" (song), 1986, by the Beastie Boys
 Brass Monkeys, a 1984 Australian sitcom
 Brass Monkey (film), a 1948 feature film
 Brass Monkey Half Marathon, a race held near York, England

Other 
 Brass statue of the three wise monkeys